Palinurus charlestoni is a species of spiny lobster which is endemic to the waters of Cape Verde. It was discovered by French fishermen in 1963, and has been the subject of small-scale fishery since. It is thought to be overexploited, and is listed as Near Threatened on the IUCN Red List.

Description

Like other spiny lobsters, it has five pairs of pereiopods (walking legs), but no chelae (claws).

In life, P. charlestoni is red to violet, but quite variable in colour. The carapace is red with white spots, while the abdomen is red with sharp white stripes on either side of the midline.

P. charlestoni can be distinguished from the other Atlantic species of Palinurus by overall colouration (being less brown than the other species), and more specifically by the patterns on the pereiopods; in P. mauritanicus, they are mottled and in P. elephas they are marked with longitudinal stripes, but in P. charlestoni, they are marked with narrow white bands alternating with wider red bands.

Distribution and ecology
Palinurus charlestoni is endemic to the Cape Verde archipelago.

Life cycle
Palinurus charlestoni breeds from June onwards, peaking in the period August–November. The eggs are brooded on the female's pleopods for 4–5 months until hatching, which begins in November and peaks in December or January. From March to May, females have never been observed carrying eggs. The young animals grow through a series of moults, which have been observed in captivity in February and March.

Fishery and management
Palinurus charlestoni first became the subject of fisheries in 1963, when three French vessels that had previously fished for P. mauritanicus off Mauritania prospected the waters of the Cape Verde islands. Their catch provided the type specimens for the species description. In 1975, Cape Verde declared independence from Portugal, although Portuguese vessels continued to fish there.

All catches of P. charlestoni are made with lobster traps, which have evolved in Cape Verde into a distinct local design. Mackerel and horse mackerel are used to bait the traps, which are then left overnight.

The size of the historical catch is not known in detail; one estimate for 1976 was 50 t, around 20–60 t was caught annually between 1982 and 1990, and production probably peaked in 1991/92, when the catch was around 85 t. Since then, the catch has generally shrunk, dropping to 14 t in 1996/97, or 35 t in 1998/99.

P. charlestoni is protected by a number of laws in Cape Verde. A ban on landing egg-bearing females was repealed, and the closed season extended from three to six months (July to November). An estimate of the maximum sustainable yield (MSY) of P. charlestoni using Fox's surplus production model suggested that the species is being overexploited; it found the MSY to be around 40 t, which could be caught using only 60% of the effort expended on the fishery in 1999. Because of the likely overexploitation, and the species' limited range, it is listed as Near Threatened on the IUCN Red List.

Taxonomy

Palinurus charlestoni was first described by Jacques Forest and E. Postel in 1964. The first specimens to be examined scientifically had been collected in late 1963 by the French lobster boat Charleston, operating out of Camaret-sur-Mer, and the specific epithet  commemorates that boat.

Evolution
P. charlestoni is one of six extant species in the genus Palinurus. According to analyses of the cytochrome oxidase gene, its nearest relatives are not Palinurus mauritanicus, which lives  to the east, off the coast of West Africa, or Palinurus elephas of the north-eastern Atlantic Ocean, but the species from the Indian Ocean – P. barbarae, P. gilchristi and P. delagoae. The genus is thought to have evolved in the Indian Ocean; from there, P. charlestoni is thought to have migrated clockwise round Africa, past the Cape of Good Hope, while its neighbour P. mauritanicus migrated anticlockwise, through the Tethys Sea.

References

Bibliography

 
 
 
 
 
 

Achelata
Crustaceans of the Atlantic Ocean
Crustaceans of Africa
Endemic fauna of Cape Verde
Arthropods of Cape Verde
Crustaceans described in 1964